The Miss Oklahoma USA competition is the pageant that selects the representative for the state of Oklahoma in the Miss USA pageant. This pageant is directed by Vanbros and Associates, headquartered in Lenexa, Kansas. In 1997, Oklahoma joined the Vanbros group of state pageants for the Miss USA and Teen USA system.

Olivia Jordan was crowned Miss USA 2015 on July 12, 2015 in Baton Rouge, Louisiana, becoming the first contestant from Oklahoma to win the national title, and as well the 34th state to have the national title. Oklahoma is in the top 20 states in terms of the number of semi-finalists.

Five Miss Oklahoma USA titleholders have previously competed at Miss Teen USA, four as Miss Oklahoma Teen USA, and one as Miss Illinois Teen USA.  Four have also competed at Miss America.

Ashley Ehrhart of Oklahoma City was crowned Miss Oklahoma USA 2022 on March 27, 2022 at OCCC Performing Arts Center in Oklahoma City. She represented Oklahoma for the title of Miss USA 2022.

Gallery of titleholders

Results summary

Placements
Miss USA: Olivia Jordan  (2015)
1st runners-up: Jill Scheffert (1989), Morgan Woolard (2010)
2nd runners-up: Triana Browne (2019),  Mariah Davis (2020)
3rd runners-up: Lindsay Hill (2004), Lindsey Jo Harrington (2008)
4th runners-up: Trula Birchfield (1952)
Top 6: Julie Khoury (1991), Heather Crickard (1996)
Top 10/12: Nancy Lippold (1978), Mignon Merchant (1983), Julia Murdock (1984), Sophia Henderson (1985), Teresa Lucas (1986), Tamara Walker (1988), DuSharme Carter (1995), Trisha Stillwell (1997), Dia Webb (1999), Cortney Phillips (2001), Star Williams (2003), Laci Scott (2005), Lauren Lundeen (2012)
Top 15/20: Roberta Mosier (1963), Jackie Maloney (1964), Cheryl Semrad (1965), Brooklynne Young (2014), Taylor Gorton  (2016)

Oklahoma holds a record of 28 placements at Miss USA.

Awards
Miss Photogenic: Cheryl Semrad (1965)
Best State Costume: Gayla Bryan (1975), Albreuna Gonzaque (2021; 3rd place)

Winners 
Color key

 Age at the time of the Miss USA pageant

References

External links
 Official Website

Oklahoma
Oklahoma culture
Women in Oklahoma
Recurring events established in 1952
1952 establishments in Oklahoma
Annual events in Oklahoma